The Diary of Sacco and Vanzetti is a 2004 American docudrama, written and directed by David Rothauser, about the trial of Sacco and Vanzetti and an account of Vanzetti's life from the moment of his arrival as an immigrant in the United States, to the events leading to his execution. Rothauser performs in his film in the role of Bartolomeo Vanzetti.

Background
David Rothauser had been interested in the events surrounding the trial of Sacco and Vanzetti since having written of them for his graduate thesis at Boston University in 1973. The concept was first developed as a full-length screenplay that included over 50 characters, but over the 30-year period of its development, Rothauser narrowed the focus to concentrate on Bartolomeo Vanzetti as the film's central figure, and to point out the flaws in the trial which led to then-Governor of Massachusetts Michael Dukakis’ official declaration in August of 1977, that "Sacco and Vanzetti had been treated unjustly and any disgrace should be forever removed from their names."

Synopsis
The film uses archived letters, speeches and documents to cover Bartolomeo Vanzetti's arrival to the United States as an immigrant, his involvement with Nicola Sacco, and the events of his trial leading up to his execution in Massachusetts in 1927.

Release
The film had its theatrical premiere at the Boston Underground Film Festival in October 2003, and continues to screen in New England seven years after initial release.

See also
 Sacco e Vanzetti, 1971 film
 Sacco and Vanzetti, 2006 film

References

External links
 

2004 films
Documentary films about anarchism
2004 drama films
Films about activists
Works about Sacco and Vanzetti
2000s English-language films